18th NSFC Awards
January 4, 1984

Best Film: 
 The Night ofthe Shooting Stars 
The 18th National Society of Film Critics Awards, given on 4 January 1984, honored the best filmmaking of 1983.

Winners

Best Picture 
1. The Night of the Shooting Stars (La notte di San Lorenzo)
2. Berlin Alexanderplatz
2. Fanny and Alexander (Fanny och Alexander)

Best Director 
1. Paolo and Vittorio Taviani – The Night of the Shooting Stars (La notte di San Lorenzo)
2. Philip Kaufman – The Right Stuff
3. Ingmar Bergman – Fanny and Alexander (Fanny och Alexander)

Best Actor 
1. Gérard Depardieu – Danton and The Return of Martin Guerre (Le retour de Martin Guerre)
2. Robert Duvall – Tender Mercies
3. Günter Lamprecht – Berlin Alexanderplatz

Best Actress 
1. Debra Winger – Terms of Endearment
2. Joanna Cassidy – Under Fire
3. Shirley MacLaine – Terms of Endearment

Best Supporting Actor 
Jack Nicholson – Terms of Endearment

Best Supporting Actress 
1. Sandra Bernhard – The King of Comedy
2. Cher – Silkwood
3. Linda Hunt – The Year of Living Dangerously

Best Screenplay 
1. Bill Forsyth – Local Hero
2. Clayton Frohman and Ron Shelton – Under Fire
3. James L. Brooks – Terms of Endearment

Best Cinematography 
1. Hiro Narita – Never Cry Wolf
2. Gordon Willis – Zelig
3. John Alcott – Under Fire

References

External links
Past Awards

1983
National Society of Film Critics Awards
National Society of Film Critics Awards
National Society of Film Critics Awards